An election to the Highland Regional Council was held on 6 May 1982 as part of the wider 1982 Scottish regional elections. The election saw Independents win control of 42 of the council's 52 seats.

Aggregate results

References

Highland
1982
May 1982 events in the United Kingdom